Marie-Josée Roig (born 12 May 1938) is a French politician.

Biography 
Marie-Josée Roig was born on 12 May 1938 in Perpignan.

She served as a member of the National Assembly from 2007 to 2012, representing the 1st District of Vaucluse.

She served as the mayor of Avignon.

References 

1938 births
Living people
People from Perpignan
Rally for the Republic politicians
Union for a Popular Movement politicians
The Popular Right
Government ministers of France
Mayors of Avignon
Politicians from Provence-Alpes-Côte d'Azur
Women mayors of places in France
20th-century French women politicians
21st-century French women politicians
Women government ministers of France
Women members of the National Assembly (France)
Deputies of the 12th National Assembly of the French Fifth Republic
Deputies of the 13th National Assembly of the French Fifth Republic